PCAA is a metabolite of the recreational drug PCP.

PCAA may also refer to:

 Big West Conference, an American college athletics conference originally named the Pacific Coast Athletic Association
 Pakistan Civil Aviation Authority, an organization that regulates civil aviation in Pakistan
 Progressive Conservative Association of Alberta, a political party in Alberta, Canada